Robert Neuwirth is an American journalist, author, and investigative reporter.   He wrote Shadow Cities: A Billion Squatters, A New Urban World, a book describing his experiences living in squatter communities in Nairobi, Rio de Janeiro, Istanbul and Mumbai.  His articles have appeared in The New York Times, The Washington Post, Forbes, The Nation, and Newsday. His second book, Stealth of Nations: The Global Rise of the Informal Economy, was published in 2011. In this book Neuwirth joins globe-trotting Nigerians who sell Chinese cell phones and laid-off San Franciscans who use Twitter to market street food and learns that the people who work in informal economies are entrepreneurs who provide essential services and crucial employment.

Education and career
Neuwirth studied philosophy in college. He began his career as a community organizer.

References

External links
 homepage for Neuwirth's squattercity, grand hotel abyss, and stealth of nations blogs
 Habitat, presentation from Pop!Tech October 2005
 The 21st Century Medieval City, Seminar at the Long Now, June 2005
  Interview with Robert Neuwirth rediff.com
 Special issue of Mute Magazine on Global Slums including review of Neuwirth's book
  (2005)
  (2012)
 

American male journalists
Living people
20th-century squatters
Year of birth missing (living people)